The Far Eastern Front (Russian: Дальневосточный фронт) was a front — a level of military formation that is equivalent to army group — of the Red Army during the Second World War.<ref>Keith E. Bonn, Slaughterhouse: The Handbook of the Eastern Front, Aberjona Press, Bedford, PA, 2005; David Glantz, Stumbling Colossus."</ref>

Early war service
Тhe Far Eastern Front was created on June 28, 1938 from the Special Red Banner Far Eastern Army within the Far East Military District.  It included the 1st Red Banner Army and the 2nd Red Banner Army.  In 1938 Front forces — seemingly the Soviet 32nd Rifle Division of 39th Rifle Corps — engaged Japanese Manchukuo forces at the Battle of Lake Khasan.  On the eve of the invasion of the Soviet Union by Germany, the Front comprised:
 1st Red Banner Army
 26th Rifle Corps
 21st Rifle Division
 22nd Rifle Division
 26th Rifle Division
 59th Rifle Corps
 39th Rifle Division
 59th Rifle Division
 1st, 4th, 5th Rifle Brigades
 8th Cavalry Division
 One fortified region, artillery, engineers
 2nd Red Banner Army
 3rd Rifle Division
 12th Amurskaya Rifle Division
 59th Tank Division
 69th Mechanized Division
 One fortified region, artillery, engineers
 15th Army
 18th Rifle Corps
 34th Rifle Division
 202nd Airborne Brigade
 One fortified region, artillery, engineers
 25th Army
 39th Rifle Corps
 32nd Rifle Division
 40th Rifle Division
 92nd Rifle Division
 Five fortified regions, artillery, and engineers
 Special Rifle Corps
 79th Rifle Division
 101st Mountain Rifle Division
 35th Rifle Division
 66th Rifle Division
 78th Rifle Division
 Three fortified regions, artillery, engineers

War against Japan
On August 5, 1945, the Front was divided and reorganized as the 1st Far Eastern Front and 2nd Far Eastern Front:

2nd Far Eastern Front, under General M. A. Purkayev (aimed at eastern Manchukuo), including: 
 2nd Red Banner Army.
 15th Army.
 16th Army.
 10th Air Army.

1st Far Eastern Front, under Marshal K. A. Meretskov (aimed at northern Manchukuo), including:
 1st Red Banner Army.
 5th Army.
 25th Army.
 35th Army
 9th Air Army
 Chuguevsk Operational Group.
 Amur River Flotilla.

Transbaikal Front included the 12th Air Army.

In the Soviet invasion of Manchuria it led the attack into Japanese-occupied Manchuria. Although the Kwantung Army of the Imperial Japanese Army had more than 1 million soldiers, the Japanese defenders were overwhelmed by the offensive. Allied forces of Mongolia and Chiang Kai-shek's Nationalist China aided the Soviet operation. On August 19, the Far East Front continued its routing of the Kwantung Army by capturing Harbin and Mukden. By August 21, the Red Army had captured almost all of Manchuria, and the final surrender of the Kwantung Army took place.

On August 11 to 12, 1945, the 87th Rifle Corps was brought out from the reserve of the 1st Far Eastern Front, and received new orders to prepare for landing operations on the island of Hokkaido (Japan); however, the planned operation never took place, although elements of the 87th Corps participated in other operations against Japanese forces in the theatre.

On September 30, 1945, the Primorskiy (Maritime Provinces) Military District was formed on the territory of Primorsky Krai (territory of the former Ussuri Oblast), from HQ 1st Far East Front.

 Commanders 

 Marshal of the Soviet Union Vasily K. Blukher (1 July – 4 September, 1938)
 Komkor Grigori M. Shtern  (August 1938; July 1940 – January 1941)
 Colonel General Iosif R. Apanasenko [promoted to Army General in February 1941] (January 1941 – April 1943)
 Colonel General Maxim A. Purkaev [promoted to Army General in October 1944] (April 1943 – August 1945)

 Notes 

 External links 
 David Glantz, Stumbling Colossus'', University Press of Kansas, 1998 (for 1941 order of battle)

Far East Front
Military units and formations disestablished in 1945
History of the Russian Far East

de:1. Fernostfront